Irene di Spilimbergo (17 October 1538 - 17 December 1559) was an Italian Renaissance painter and poet.

Biography
She is mostly known for an effusive volume of poetic elegies published two years after her death by Dionigi Atanagi and containing 279 Italian and 102 Latin poems, some anonymous, and others either penned or attributed to contemporary cultural figures including Lodovico Dolce, Torquato Tasso, Titian, Girolamo Muzio, Luigi Tanzillo, Giuseppe Bettusi, and Benedetto Varchi.

Born in Spilimbergo (in the Province of Pordenone), a small town about thirty kilometers northwest of Udine, by report she demonstrated her artistic abilities at a young age. She is compared sometimes with another woman painter, Sofonisba Anguissola (born in Cremona and of greater longevity (1532–1625). Irene studied under Titian for two years. Few if any of her works are known. Her true nature and skills are difficult to sift from the poetic legend; she was for her eulogists the equivalent of the prototypical ever-innocent feminine charm, what Beatrice was to Dante and Laura to Petrarch, although girded with a paint-brush for the craft-oriented Renaissance.

The National Gallery of Art (Washington D.C.) houses two paintings in relation to her: a portrait of her sister Emilia di Spilimbergo, with a landscape background, has been attributed to Gian Paolo Pace, a follower of Titian, and a pendant portrait of Irene di Spilimbergo is thought to be by Gian Paolo Pace and Titian.

She died in Venice at the age of 21.

References

External links
 ArtNet biography via the Internet Archive
 Irene di Spilimbergo: The Image of a Creative Woman in Late Renaissance Italy, Anne Jacobson Schutte, Renaissance Quarterly, Vol. 44, No. 1 (Spring, 1991), pp. 42–61
 Jacobs, Fredrika Herman. Defining the Renaissance Virtuosa: Women Artists and the Language of Art History and Criticism. Cambridge ; New York: Cambridge University Press, 1997.
 Schutte, Anne Jacobson. "Commemorators of Irene Di Spilimbergo." Renaissance Quarterly 45, no. 3 (1992): 524-36.

1540 births
1559 deaths
People from the Province of Pordenone
Italian Renaissance painters
Italian women painters
16th-century Italian painters
16th-century Italian women artists